Andrew "A. J." Sass is an American author of children's and young adult fiction, best known for his middle grade contemporary novel, Ana on the Edge, and his Time op-ed discussing transgender and non-binary character representation in youth literature.

Personal life 
Sass grew up in the Midwestern and Southern United States and began training in figure skating as a child. He passed his U.S. Figure Skating Senior Moves in the Field test while in law school, then worked as a technical writer and legal editor while writing creatively on the side. His debut middle grade novel, Ana on the Edge, was purchased by Little, Brown Books for Young Readers.

At the age of 33, Sass passed the U.S. Figure Skating Senior Free Skate test, then went on to compete as a member of the Masters synchronized skating team, IceSymmetrics. IceSymmetrics won the bronze medal at the 2018 U.S. Synchronized Skating Championships and the silver medal at the 2019 U.S. Synchronized Skating Championships. Sass also holds test judge appointments with U.S. Figure Skating in Gold Singles and Bronze Ice Dance.

Sass is Jewish and autistic. He describes himself as queer and non-binary, and uses he/him and they/them pronouns.

He lives in the San Francisco Bay Area.

Selected works 
Sass' work focuses on the intersections between faith, identity, and allyship.

Ana on the Edge

Sass' debut novel follows twelve-year-old Ana-Marie Jin, the reigning U.S. Juvenile figure skating champion, as Ana navigates old and new friendships, the financial hardships of elite figure skating, and a newly discovered non-binary gender identity. It was published by Little, Brown Books for Young Readers on October 20, 2020, and received a starred review from Booklist. Ana on the Edge went on to be named a Booklist Editors' Choice: Books for Youth, 2020 selection, an American Library Association 2021 Rainbow List Top 10 for Young Readers title, a selection in the Chicago Review of Books Notable List of Debut Books by Trans, Non-binary, and Gender Non-conforming Authors, and was named to the New York Public Library's "Favorite Trans, Nonbinary, and GNC Titles of 2020. It also received a favorable review in The New York Times Book Review.

Ellen Outside the Lines

Sass' second novel features Ellen Katz, an autistic thirteen-year-old, who is attempting to regain a long-time friendship on a class trip to Barcelona, Spain. It explores Spanish and Catalan culture, as well as queer and Jewish identity. Ellen Outside the Lines released on March 22, 2022, from Little, Brown Books for Young Readers.

Camp QUILTBAG*

Co-authored with Nicole Melleby, Camp QUILTBAG* is a story about twelve-year-old Abigail Rabb and thirteen-year-old Kai Lindquist, who are attending a summer camp for queer youth for vastly different reasons. They make a pact to help themselves settle in at camp, all while navigating their queer identities and a competition pitting cabin against cabin. It is scheduled to be released by Algonquin Young Readers in spring 2023.

Bibliography 
Novels
 Ana on the Edge (Little, Brown Books for Young Readers, 2020)
 Ellen Outside the Lines (Little, Brown Books for Young Readers, 2022)
 Camp QUILTBAG* (Algonquin Young Readers, 2023; co-authored with Nicole Melleby)

Essays
"This Is What It Feels Like" in Allies: Real Talk About Showing Up, Screwing Up, and Trying Again (DK/Penguin Random House, 2021)

Short stories
 "Balancing Acts" in This Is Our Rainbow: 16 Stories of Her, Him, Them, and Us (Knopf Books for Young Readers, 2021)

Op eds
 "I'm a Nonbinary Writer of Youth Literature. J.K. Rowling's Comments on Gender Identity Reinforced My Commitment to Better Representation" (Time, 2020)

References 

American children's writers
LGBT figure skaters
Year of birth missing (living people)
Living people
21st-century LGBT people
American non-binary writers